Michael Pierce Milliken (born March 13, 1947) was the fifth bishop of the Episcopal Diocese of Western Kansas from 2011 until 2018.

Biography
Milliken was born on March 13, 1947, in Lexington, Kentucky. He studied at the University of Kentucky from where he graduated with a Bachelor of Arts in 1970. Later he also attended the and Berkeley Divinity School and the Episcopal Theological Seminary in Kentucky from  where he graduated in 1973 with a Master of Divinity. He also studied for a Master of Arts in Theology at Xavier University, which he earned in 1993. 

He was ordained deacon on May 26, 1973, and then priest on November 30, 1973. Between 1973 and 1977 he served as vicar of St Matthew's Church before becoming rector of Grace Church in Florence, Kentucky, a position he held until 1998. He then became rector of Grace Church in Hutchinson, Kansas. 

On August 21, 2010, Milliken was elected on the second ballot as Bishop of Western Kansas and was consecrated on February 19, 2011. He retained the rectorship of Grace Church in Hutchinson for the first three years of his bishopric. He was succeeded by Mark Cowell on December 1, 2018, ending his term.  He was serving as the Assisting Bishop of the Episcopal Diocese of Kansas from the retirement of Bishop Dean Wolfe until the consecration of Cathleen Chittenden Bascom as the 10th Bishop of the Episcopal Diocese of Kansas on March 2, 2019. He married Kathleen Smith on August 2, 1969, and together have one son.

See also
 List of Episcopal bishops of the United States
 Historical list of the Episcopal bishops of the United States

References

1947 births
Living people
American Episcopalians
University of Kentucky alumni
Episcopal bishops of Western Kansas